Lori Greiner (born December 9, 1969) is an American television personality and entrepreneur. She is an investor on the reality ABC TV series Shark Tank. Greiner has hundreds of inventions and holds 120 patents. She became known as the "Queen of QVC" as a result of her show, Clever & Unique Creations, that premiered on the network in 2000. Greiner is the president and founder of For Your Ease Only, Inc.

Life
Greiner grew up in the Near North Side, Chicago. She majored in communications at Loyola University Chicago and worked for The Chicago Tribune while in college. She was an aspiring playwright and sold jewelry on the side. She is married to Dan Greiner.

Career
Greiner is the president and founder of For Your Ease Only, which launched in 1996. The same year, she created and patented a plastic earring organizer; J.C. Penney picked up the product before the holiday season, allowing her to pay off her $300,000 loan in 18 months. In addition to jewelry storage, she has patented consumer products in categories such as cosmetic organization, travel, electronics, and household items. Greiner has invented hundreds of products and holds 120 patents.

After her success with J.C. Penney, Greiner expanded her company, with her products appearing on Home Shopping Network and in the retail store Bed, Bath and Beyond. In 2000, she began hosting a show on QVC, "Clever & Unique Creations by Lori Greiner". Her many appearances on the network led to her nickname, "The Queen of QVC".

In 2012, Greiner joined the U.S. TV series Shark Tank. In 2014, her investment in Scrub Daddy, a company that produces a texture-changing household sponge, was regarded as one of the biggest successes in Shark Tank history. Greiner's other early Shark Tank investments include Bantam Bagels (which was fully acquired by T. Marzetti Company in 2018), Squatty Potty, ReadeRest, Paint Brush Cover, Hold Your Haunches, Drop Stop, FiberFix, Simply Fit Board, Sleep Styler, and Screenmend.

Greiner's book, Invent it, Sell it, Bank it! – Make Your Million Dollar Idea into a Reality, was published in March 2014.

References

External links

1969 births
Living people
American television personalities
American women television personalities
American women chief executives
Businesspeople from Chicago
Chicago Tribune people
Women inventors
Loyola University Chicago alumni
QVC people
20th-century American inventors
21st-century American inventors
21st-century American women
Year of birth missing (living people)